Feather Plume Falls is an ephemeral waterfall located above Cataract Creek in Glacier National Park, Montana, US. The falls are on the northeast slopes of Mount Gould in the Many Glacier region of the park.

References

Waterfalls of Glacier National Park (U.S.)